The Pavillon de l’Horloge ("Clock Pavilion"), also known as the Pavillon Sully, is a prominent architectural structure located in the center of the western wing of the Cour Carrée of the Palais du Louvre in Paris. Since the late 19th century, the name Pavillon de l'Horloge has generally been applied to the structure's eastern face, which dates from the 17th century, and the name Pavillon Sully to its western face, which was redecorated in the 1850s as part of Napoleon III's Louvre expansion.

History

The pavilion was built just north of the older Lescot Wing between 1624 and about 1645, a protracted process because of the difficulties faced by France in the late 1620s and 1630s. The structure and its iconic square-domed roof (AKA The nob) were designed by architect Jacques Lemercier, who was selected in a competition in 1624.

It remained there until 1806, when it was removed for aesthetic and safety reasons by the Louvre's architect Pierre-François-Léonard Fontaine.

In the early 19th century, a clock was placed on the attic level, giving the pavilion its current name.

The western façade was comprehensively remodeled by Hector Lefuel in the 1850s during the Second Empire. that is when the name of Pavillon Sully (after Maximilien de Béthune, duc de Sully) was given to it. Lefuel also rebuilt the structure's two iconic chimneys, which had been demolished in the early 19th century.

Interior

It was remade in the 1980s as part of the Grand Louvre project, under which it also connects the underground spaces beneath the Louvre Pyramid with the newly established rooms preserving the remains of the Medieval Louvre.

On the first floor above the passageway are a corridor linking the two monumental staircases that flank the Pavilion and, facing the Cour Napoléon, a large room that was fitted in the 1650s to be the Louvre Palace Chapel. A 1915 project to restore the double height was left unimplemented. The room was used for exhibition of ancient bronze objects, then for temporary exhibitions from the 1990s to the 2010s, and since July 2016 has been dedicated to the history of the Louvre's collections. On its entrance door is a wrought iron gate originally from the Château de Maisons, installed there in 1819 by architect Pierre Fontaine.

On the second floor or attic, the main room above the former chapel has been devoted since 2016 to information about new developments at the Louvre and its two satellites in Lens, Northern France and Abu Dhabi, UAE.

The third floor used to be a single large room extending all the way to the roof. From its completion in 1644 it was used to store furniture. In the 1850s, Hector Lefuel created a skylight to bring light from the ceiling. This room was remodeled by Louvre architect  around 1920, and the Louvre's pioneering collection of Islamic art was displayed there from June 1922. This room, however, was partitioned in 1979 to create reserve space for the Louvre's paintings collection, and further partitioned in the 2000s so that it now has four levels inside.

The timber work supporting the roof is largely original from the 17th century.

See also
 Pavillon du Roi

Notes

Further reading
 Blunt, Anthony (1960). "Two Unpublished Drawings by Lemercier for the Pavillon de l'Horloge", The Burlington Magazine, vol. 102, no. 691 (October), pp. 446–448. 

Louvre Palace